Claude-Philibert Barthelot, comte de Rambuteau (Mâcon, 9 November 1781 – Château de Rambuteau, 11 April 1869) was a French senior official of the first half of the 19th century. He was Préfet of the former Départment of the Seine, which included Paris, from 1833 to 1848. He established the groundwork for the fundamental transformation of Paris that Haussmann carried out under the Second Empire.

Career
His administration was marked by the implementation of the theories of the hygienists. One year before his nomination, an epidemic of cholera devastated Paris. Rambuteau thought that the narrow, tortuous streets and small disease-prone districts in the centre of Paris encouraged the development of the disease. He commenced the cutting of 13 metre-wide roads through Paris with the widening of the Rue Rambuteau in 1839, which was later named after him. This was the first time wide roads had been built in central Paris.   

Under his administration, the Arc de Triomphe in the Place de l'Étoile was finished and the building of the great avenue of the Champs-Élysées was commenced.  

The motto of Rambuteau was: "water, air, shade". He thus modernised the sewers of Paris and ordered the construction of many fountains. Some of his fountains in Paris parks still function.  He developed gas lighting and the planting of trees along the avenues. At the beginning of his administration the city had 69 gas jets; at his departure it had 8,600 gas jets. He also commenced the construction of the famous pissoirs (public urinals) along the roads of Paris.    

In spite of the enactment of the law of expropriation in the public interest in 1841, Rambuteau did not have the means or the ambition to implement the work that Haussmann later carried out, but he showed the way forward.

Personal life
He married at Agen on 7 March 1808 Marie Adélaide Charlotte de Narbonne-Lara (Belleville, 11 May 1790 - Champgrenon, 31 May 1856), second daughter of Louis, comte de Narbonne-Lara and Marie Adélaïde de Montholon, and had two daughters: 
 Amable Françoise Barthelot de Rambuteau, married in Paris on 16 July 1835 Jean Jacques Louis Lombard de Buffières (Lyon, 15 July 1800 - Lyon, 26 July 1875), son of Claude, Baron Lombard de Buffières, and Monique Rast de Maupas, and had four sons, who used the name Lombard de Buffières de Rambuteau
 Marie Louise Barthelot de Rambuteau (1812 - 7 September 1880), married Théodore Gilles Louis Alphonse de Rocca (17 April 1812 - 12 November 1842), without issue. De Rocca was the son of Madame de Staël and Albert de Rocca.

References

Sources
 Domingos de Araújo Afonso et alii, Le Sang de Louis XIV (Braga, 1961), Tome I, p. 276.

1781 births
1869 deaths
Counts of France
19th century in Paris
19th-century French people